Brian McDermott may refer to:
 Brian McDermott (footballer) (born 1961), footballer and former manager of Reading F.C.
 Brian McDermott (rugby league) (born 1970), footballer and coach of Leeds Rhinos
 Brian McDermott (murder victim), child who was murdered in Belfast in 1973, case still unsolved